The İzmir Art and Sculpture Museum and Gallery is an art museum in İzmir, Turkey.

Established by the Turkish state in 1952 as the İzmir State Painting and Sculpture Museum, the museum was later moved from the Kültürpark to its present location on Atatürk Boulevard near the Konak pier. The small museum displays mostly 20th-century paintings and sculptures from Turkish artists, and has a substantial collection of works by Turgut Pura.

References

Art museums and galleries in Turkey
Arts in İzmir
Museums in İzmir
Art museums established in 1952
1952 establishments in Turkey